Recorrupted is the first EP by American deathcore band Whitechapel. The EP was released on November 8, 2011 through Metal Blade Records. It consists of one original song, two of their previously released songs remixed ("This Is Exile" and "Breeding Violence"), an acoustic version of "End of Flesh" and a cover of the Pantera song "Strength Beyond Strength".

Track listing

Personnel
Whitechapel
 Phil Bozeman – vocals
 Alex Wade – guitar
 Ben Savage – lead guitar
 Gabe Crisp – bass guitar
 Zach Householder – guitar
 Ben Harclerode – drums

Production
 Miah Lajeunesse – recording engineer, producer
 Mark Lewis – mixing and mastering
 Shawn Carrano and Andrew Roesch – management
 Mike Milford – artwork

References 

2011 EPs
Whitechapel (band) albums
Deathcore EPs
Metal Blade Records EPs